John Downer (November 22, 1881 – January 28, 1977) was an American equestrian. He competed in the individual jumping event at the 1920 Summer Olympics.

References

1881 births
1977 deaths
American male equestrians
Olympic equestrians of the United States
Equestrians at the 1920 Summer Olympics
People from Charles Town, West Virginia